Monticello is city in Wayne County, Kentucky, in the United States. It is the seat of its county. The population was 6,188 at the time of the 2010 U.S. census.

Monticello claims to be "The Houseboat Capital of the World" as there are numerous houseboat manufacturers in the city. The city is located along Lake Cumberland. Its economy is built on serving the recreational and tourist traffic to the lake.

Geography
Monticello is located at  (36.838194, -84.850022).

Monticello is located near the center of Wayne County, along Elk Creek, a tributary of Beaver Creek, which flows westward into Lake Cumberland. State highways 92, 90, and 167, were constructed to intersect at the county seat.

History 

Monticello was designated as the county seat when the Wayne County was formed in 1800. The first Wayne County Clerk, Micah Taul, named the town after Thomas Jefferson's plantation and home, who was elected President of the United States that year. Joshua Jones, a surveyor and Revolutionary War veteran, laid out the town on thirteen acres owned by William Beard. By 1810, the population numbered twenty-seven.

In the late 1800s, oil was discovered in Wayne County, creating an economic boost. Drilling began in these local oil fields in the 1880s and was renewed in 1921, and 1922.

Electricity was introduced to the city in 1905. City water was installed in 1929. Manufacturing dominated the economy from the late 1950s and 1960s until the late 20th and early 21st century.

In 1973, Belden Corporation (wire and cable) employed 300 people; Gamble Brothers (wood products) employed 161 people; Waterbury Garment (clothing) employed 271 people; and Monticello Manufacturing (clothing) employed 240 people. Each of these companies has left Monticello.

Demographics

As of the census of 2000, there were 5,981 people, 2,508 households, and 1,635 families residing in the city. The racial makeup of the city was 94.63% White, 2.42% African American, 0.40% Native American, 0.28% Asian, 1.34% from other races, and 0.92% from two or more races. Hispanic or Latino people of any race were 2.96% of the population.

There were 2,508 households, out of which 31.3% had children under the age of 18 living with them, 46.7% were married couples living together, 14.9% had a female householder with no husband present, and 34.8% were non-families. 31.7% of all households were made up of individuals, and 16.0% had someone living alone who was 65 years of age or older. The average household size was 2.33 and the average family size was 2.91.

In the city, the population was spread out, with 25.0% under the age of 18, 9.7% from 18 to 24, 25.9% from 25 to 44, 21.9% from 45 to 64, and 17.4% who were 65 years of age or older. The median age was 36 years. For every 100 females, there were 88.9 males. For every 100 females age 18 and over, there were 84.5 males.

The median income for a household in the city was $17,423, and the median income for a family was $24,460. Males had a median income of $28,638 versus $19,259 for females. The per capita income for the city was $11,855. About 29.2% of families and 34.1% of the population were below the poverty line, including 39.9% of those under age 18 and 35.4% of those age 65 or over.

Education
As of June 30, 2013 it is served by Wayne County Schools.

The first recorded school in Wayne County was opened about 1800 by Robert Ferrill, a well-educated wheelwright who had a few good books. Monticello's first school was opened in 1807 by Rodes Garth, who taught "Roman history, the Scriptures, orthography, and pronunciation."  In 1819, Yale graduate John S. Frisbie began a school with Michael Huffaker as the first teacher of record.  The Monticello Academy was established in 1830 with John Lankford as the headmaster, followed by Professor Mullins, and later William Burton.

In 1843, under the guidance of Commissioners Micajah Phillips, John Rousseau, Martin Beaty, and Francis Goddard, the county voted and ratified to organize into common school districts.

The first examiners for receiving a teaching certificate were physician Jonathan S. Frisbie, lawyer John Lankford, and teacher Littleton Beard.

By 1842 there were 16 school houses in Wayne County, three listed within several miles of Monticello.

Teachers at these schools before the Civil War include Amanda McGee, William and Thomas Simpson, Joseph Ballou, and Marcellus Baugh.

In these early schools, textbooks were scarce, but included Dilworth's Spelling Book, Murray's English Reader and English Grammar, Noble Butler's Goodrich Readers and Grammar, and the McGuffey's Readers.

The first school superintendent of Wayne County was Robert McBeath, a "member of a family noted for their intellectual qualities." His son, Tom McBeath, moved on to be President of Florida State University.

In 1866, following the Civil War, the Kendrick Academy opened in Monticello with Milton Elliott as principal. Teachers in Monticello in the 1860s and 70s include Marion Huffaker, Marshall Stone, and Ala Shearer. Ones in the 1880s and 90s include Lucy and Amanda Taylor, Sallie and Eula Kendrick, Emma Kelley, Fount Cooper, William Sandusky, Tobias Huffaker, and Mollie Denny, who became the Wayne county superintendent. In 1872, the Kendrick Academy closed due to a fire.

In 1879, a girls' school was opened by Roxie Buchanan, followed by William Bradshaw, and in 1885 W.T. Chaffin opened Classical High School with teachers T. Leigh Thompson, T. C. Job, and Georgia Brock; and in about 1890 added kindergarten and primary schools with teachers Ms. Oakley and Graves.  Successive principals at the school up until the close of the nineteenth century were W. T. Chafin, T. Leigh Thompson, Professor H. C. Jones, Hayden Grubbs, Professor Chafin again, and finally Mr. Ballard.

From 1905 until 2013 Monticello had Monticello Independent Schools, its own school district independent of the surrounding Wayne County Schools.

Vocational education 
Wayne County Vocational School has served students of Wayne County since 1971. The school has had many name changes over the years and is currently named Wayne County Area Technology Center (ATC). Wayne County ATC is managed by the Office of Career and Technical Education. The school serves secondary students enrolled in Wayne County High School.  Programs include Health Science, Welding, Carpentry, Machine Tool, Automotive, Industrial Maintenance and Business.

State government representatives
Max Wise of Campbellsville, Kentucky is the current Kentucky State Senator, representing District 16 which includes Wayne, Adair, Clinton, Cumberland, McCreary, Russell, and Taylor counties.  The District 52 Kentucky House of Representatives seat is held by Ken Upchurch of Monticello. District 52 includes Wayne County, McCreary County, and part of Pulaski County.

Notable people
Dick Burnett (1883–1977), folk musician
Shelby Moore Cullom, United States Senator, Congressman, and Governor from Illinois
 Kevin Denney, country music artist
 Martin Massengale (born 1933), President of the University of Nebraska system from 1989 to 1994
 Louise Slaughter (1929–2018), U.S. Congresswoman from New York
 Sara Beth Gregory, member Kentucky House of Representatives and Kentucky Senate
 Mark Cole, member Virginia House of Delegates
 Walter Dee Huddleston (1926–2018), U.S. Senator from Kentucky
 Ken Upchurch (born 1969), member Kentucky House of Representatives
 Thomas Hansford Williams (1828–1886), former Attorney General of California

References

External links

 City of Monticello, Kentucky homepage

Cities in Kentucky
Cities in Wayne County, Kentucky
County seats in Kentucky
1801 establishments in Kentucky